The 1914 Ottoman census was collected and published as the Memalik-i Osmaniyyenin 1330 Senesi Nütus Istatistiki. These statistics were prepared by using the figures from the 1905–06 census of the Ottoman Empire and reflecting births and deaths registered in six years from last. The register states that birth and mortality rate used on "nomads" such as the nomadic Nestorians.

The 1914 census list reflected major changes in the territorial boundaries and administrative division of the Ottoman state. The population statistics and 1914 Ottoman general election were major population sources. The empire's total population was provided as 18,520,015. The grand total for 1914 showed a "net gain" of 1,131,454 from the 1905-06 Ottoman census survey. The data reflects the loss of territory and population in Europe due to Balkan Wars, as the total net gain figure would be 3,496,068.

The census underestimated non-Muslim populations. For example, in Diyarbekir the Armenian population was reported at 73,226 in the 1914 Ottoman census, but in September 1915 Mehmed Reshid announced that he had deported 120,000 Armenians from the province.

Census data 

As a result of the substantial territorial losses in Europe suffered during the Balkan wars, the total population of the empire fell to 18,520,016, of whom an even larger percentage than before, 15,044,846, was counted as Muslim, with 1,729,738 as Greek Orthodox, 1,161,169 as Armenian Gregorian, 187,073 as Jewish, 68,838 as Armenian Catholic, 65,844 as Protestant, and 62,468 as Greek Catholic. No separate figures were given for Franks.

The capital, Constantinople (Istanbul) was an important location due to expulsions from Balkan Wars. According to the 1914 census, its population increased slightly, to 909,978, excluding Franks, with 560,434 Muslims, 205,375 Greek Orthodox, 72,963 Armenian Gregorian, 52,126 Jews, 9,918 Armenian Catholics, 2,905 Roman Catholics, 1,213 Protestants, and 387 Greek Catholics.

1 Sanjak

Notes

References

Bibliography 

Demographics of the Ottoman Empire
1914 in the Ottoman Empire